Burnt Wagons is a former settlement in Inyo County, California, near Stovepipe Wells. The name recalls the emigrants of 1849 who abandoned and burnt their wagons at the site. The site is now registered as California Historical Landmark #441. The monument's plaque reads:
Near this monument, the Jayhawker group of Death Valley Forty-Niners, gold seekers from Middle West, who entered Death Valley in 1849 seeking short route to the mines of central California, burned their wagons, dried the meat of some oxen and, with surviving animals, struggled westward on foot.

See also
California Historical Landmarks in Inyo County
History of California through 1899

References

Former settlements in Inyo County, California
Populated places in the Mojave Desert
Death Valley
Former populated places in California